The women's double sculls competition at the 1996 Summer Olympics in Atlanta, Georgia took place at Lake Lanier.

Results

Heats
SA/B denotes qualification to Semifinal A/B.
R denotes qualification to Repechage.

Heat 1

Heat 2

Heat 3

Repechage
First three qualify to the semifinals, the remainder are eliminated.

Repechage 1

Semi-finals
A denotes qualification to Final A.
B denotes qualification to Final B.

Semi-final 1

Semi-final 2

Finals

Final B

Final A

References

Rowing at the 1996 Summer Olympics
Women's rowing at the 1996 Summer Olympics